The A500 autoroute, also known as "Bretelle de Monaco", is a 2 km motorway, departing from A8 near Monaco exchange and arriving to the Moyenne Corniche near Cap d'Ail via monotube tunnel.

Characteristics
3 lanes in 1 carriageway: 1 lane from west to east, 2 lanes from east to west
maximum speed limit: 90 km/h

Junctions

 56 (Monaco)  Half exchanger from A8 and A500
  Toll booth of Monaco
 57 (La Turbie) half exchanger. Towns served: La Turbie
  (D6007) A500 enters D6007 with a half exchanger. Towns served: Monaco, via D6007 (Moyenne Corniche)

External links 
  A500 on Saratlas

Autoroutes in France